Fabien Boudarène (born 5 October 1978) is a French former professional footballer of Algerian origin who played as a defensive midfielder.

Born in Saint-Étienne, Boudarène began his career with the local AS Saint-Étienne in Ligue 2, helping the team to a promotion to Ligue 1 in 1999. In 2001, he moved to FC Sochaux-Montbéliard and played for the club until 2006, when he was transferred to Ligue 2 side Dijon FCO. In June 2007, Boudarène was acquired by the Bulgarian club PFC Litex Lovech.

External links
 
 
 

Living people
1978 births
Footballers from Saint-Étienne
Association football midfielders
French footballers
AS Saint-Étienne players
Algerian footballers
FC Sochaux-Montbéliard players
Dijon FCO players
First Professional Football League (Bulgaria) players
PFC Litex Lovech players
FC Universitatea Cluj players
French sportspeople of Algerian descent
Expatriate footballers in Romania
Liga I players
French expatriate sportspeople in Romania
Ligue 1 players
Vannes OC players
FC Aurillac Arpajon Cantal Auvergne players
GSI Pontivy players
US Feurs players